Karl Bergmann (15 November 1882 – 16 June 1964) was a Norwegian actor and theatre director. He made his stage debut in 1901 at Den Nationale Scene in Bergen. He served as theatre director of Den Nationale Scene from 1931 to 1934.

Personal life
Bergmann was born in Bergen on 15 November 1882, a son of hairdresser Carl Pedersen and Alida Bergmann. In 1906 he married actress Lilly Catharina Thomsen.

References

1882 births
1964 deaths
Theatre people from Bergen
Norwegian male stage actors
Norwegian theatre directors
Actors from Bergen